Ecopa Arena is a multi-purpose indoor arena in Fukuroi, Japan. The capacity of the arena is 10,000 and was opened in 2001.

Other facilities
Ecopa Stadium

Access
Train
 JR: Tokaido Main Line, Aino Station (Shizuoka)\Aino Station

Car
 Tomei Expressway: Kakegawa Interchange
 Tomei Expressway : Fukuroi Interchange

References

External links
 Official site of Ecopa 

Basketball venues in Japan
Indoor arenas in Japan
Sports venues in Shizuoka Prefecture
Sports venues completed in 2001
2001 establishments in Japan
Fukuroi, Shizuoka